Garry Eldridge Brown (August 12, 1923 – August 27, 1998) was a politician from the U.S. state of Michigan. He served six terms in the United States House of Representatives from 1967 to 1979.

Biography
Brown was born in Schoolcraft, Michigan to a family with a political background in Michigan. His  great-grandfather, Ebenezer Lakin Brown, and his grandfather, Addison Makepeace Brown, both served in the Michigan State Legislature.

During World War II, Brown served in the Twenty-fourth Infantry Regiment of the United States Army as second lieutenant in Japan. After the war, he worked for the FBI, under Hoover, before earning a B.A. from Kalamazoo College in 1951 and a LL.B from The George Washington University Law School in 1954. He was admitted to the bar in 1954 and commenced practice in Kalamazoo. He was commissioner of the United States District Court for the Western District of Michigan from 1957 to 1962 and was a delegate to the Michigan constitutional convention of 1961-1962.

Political career
He served two terms in the Michigan State Senate from 1962 to 1966, where he was minority floor leader and chairman of the Republican senate policy committee.

In 1966, Brown defeated incumbent Democrat Paul H. Todd, Jr., one of the "Five Fluke Freshmen", to be elected as a Republican to the U.S. House of Representatives from Michigan's 3rd congressional district for the Ninetieth and to the five succeeding Congresses, serving from January 3, 1967 to January 3, 1979. He was an unsuccessful candidate for reelection in 1978, losing to Democrat Howard E. Wolpe.

Personal life
He resumed the practice of law and was a resident of Washington, D.C. until his death.

Garry Brown had four daughters, Frances, Mollie, Amelia, and Abigail. His family owned and operated a dairy farm while he was growing up in Schoolcraft, Michigan. They were one of the first to settle there, and his family still owns the original property that the Browns settled on in the 1830s.

He died in 1998 and is interred in Schoolcraft, Michigan.

External links
 Retrieved on 2009-5-20

1923 births
1998 deaths
Republican Party Michigan state senators
United States Army officers
George Washington University Law School alumni
Kalamazoo College alumni
United States Army personnel of World War II
People from Kalamazoo County, Michigan
Republican Party members of the United States House of Representatives from Michigan
20th-century American politicians